Raja Sálbán (also known as Shalivahana or Salvaan) was a Bhatti Rajput king of the Indian subcontinent in the 10th-11th century CE, who is believed to have founded the fort (later a city) of Sialkot. Sialkot is now in the Punjab province of Pakistan, near the country's north eastern border with India.

Raja Salvaan/Salbaan had two wives, named Rani Loona Chumba and Rani Ichhran; Rani is synonymous with Queen. Rani Loona came from a family of Jammu while Rani Ichhran belonged to a family who lived in Roras near Ugoki.

When Rani Ichhran's palace was close to completion, she gave birth to a beautiful child who was Raja Salbahan's first son and in line to be the next Raja or King. The people of Sialkot were very happy and they celebrated his birth. The palace was decorated with lights for many weeks. People visited to see the palace from all parts of the country. On the advice of some local pandits astrologers and palmists, the young Prince's name was chosen to be Puran (as Poo-rann). Rani Loona was the second wife of Raja Salbahan but she was childless. So as Raja Salbahan grew closer to Rani Ichhran, Rani Loona felt jealous of her and did not miss any opportunities to insult Rani Ichhran and Puran.

Prince Puran grew up to be a handsome young man. Rani Loona felt attraction toward the young prince but he was a gentleman. Rani Loona tried to seduce the prince in her room but he managed to escape. Rani Loona felt so ashamed and angry that she lied to Raja Salbahan by telling him that Prince Puran had attempted to rape her. Raja Salbahan became so infuriated that he ordered his soldiers to cut off Prince Puran's hands and feet and throw him in a well. The soldiers carried out Raja Salbahan's orders and threw the Prince in a well outside the city called as Puran's Well.

References

Punjabi culture
History of Punjab
Sialkot
2nd-century Indian monarchs
Legendary Indian people
Punjabi folklore
Indian folklore